Phaeoclavulina murrillii is a coral fungus that is widely distributed in the southeastern United States. It has also been found as far North in the United States as Michigan, and in Spain.

Taxonomy 
It was first found in 1904 by William Alphonso Murrill. Originally, it was coined as Clavaria murrilli by William Chambers Coker. Later it was moved to Ramaria by Edred John Henry Corner.

Description

Fruit body 
The fruit body may be growing singularly or in scattered groups on the ground in humus in broadleaf or mixed broadleaf and conifer forests from June through October. Fruiting has additionally been reported as occurring in low nutrient areas within meadows. The size ranges from 4-12 centimeters high that are coral-like in appearance with many branches and arising from a rounded, central stalk. Much of the lower portion of the fruitbody and the stipe have white threads that stain pinkish, and these threads can be observed on dry specimens too. The branches are rounded and described as a "dull brownish pink to pale rusty brown, darkening when bruised", and are fibrous-tough and twisted and divided. The branch tips can be pointed or blunt, and are white at first, becoming "golden-yellow to orange" and turning more brown with age.

Spore print 
The spores have a "dull ochraceous tan" deposit.

Microscopic features 
The spores "appear brown under the microscope". The spore size is comparatively more divergent than similar species ranging from 6.5-9.5 × 3.5-5.5 μm, and they are "elliptic to bottle-shaped" or "elongate pip-shaped". The basidia are clavate, 5-5.5 μm wide and 4-spored. The hymenium is 50–60 μm thick. The hyphae are 3.5–5 μm wide and clamp-connections are present.

Chemical test 
Applying FeSO4 to the branches will cause them to stain green.

Edibility 
The edibility is unknown. It has a nondistinctive odor, and the taste of the flesh is described as bitter.

Synonyms 

 Clavaria murrilli
 Ramaria murrilli

References 

Gomphaceae